Troy Ryan (born January 26, 1972) is a Canadian ice hockey coach. He currently serves as the head coach of the Canadian national women's hockey team. In July 2020, he was hired to serve as the head coach for the Dalhousie Tigers women's ice hockey program.

Playing career
Growing up in Spryfield, Nova Scotia, Ryan competed at the AAA level with the Halifax McDonald's Midget team before joining the Quebec Major Junior Hockey League's Halifax Mooseheads. After his stint with the Mooseheads, Ryan played university hockey with two different programs. From 1993 to 1995, he skated for the University of New Brunswick Varsity Reds, followed by a pair of seasons with the Saint Mary’s Huskies.

Coaching career
At the university level, Ryan would also gain his first major coaching experience. Starting in 2001, Ryan would enjoy a pair of seasons with the Acadia Axemen men's varsity hockey program. Following his initial coaching foray in university hockey, Ryan would join the Maritime Junior A Hockey League in 2003, becoming general manager and head coach of the Antigonish Bulldogs. Afterwards, he would serve in those dual roles from 2004-09 with the Pictou County Weeks Crushers, taking the team to the semi-finals of the 2008 RBC Cup. 

From 2013-16, Ryan served in multiple capacities with the Maritime Hockey League’s (MHL) Campbellton Tigers, including head coach, general manager, and president. He also served in the same roles with the league's Metro Marauders from 2009-11. Sandwiched in between those two stints in the MHL, he was the head coach for the St. Thomas University Tommies men’s hockey team of the Atlantic University Sport conference.

Women's Ice Hockey
In 2015, Ryan took on head coaching duties in two different women's ice hockey events. At the 2015 Canada Winter Games, Ryan served as bench boss for Team Nova Scotia, finishing in seventh place. As a side note, he had also served as head coach for the Nova Scotia men's team at the 2007 Canada Winter Games. For the 2015 National Women’s Under-18 Championship, Ryan served in the same role with Team Atlantic, finishing fifth. One year later, Ryan was named Atlantic Canada's female coach mentor with the Canadian Sport Centre Atlantic.

Hockey Canada
With the Canadian women's national under 18 ice hockey team, Ryan enjoyed his first experiences as a head coach in the Hockey Canada program. August 2016 would see Ryan serve as bench boss for a three-game series in Calgary between the Canadian and American Under-18 programs. Ryan would serve in the same role, leading the Canadian contingent to a silver medal at the 2017 IIHF World Women's U18 Championship in the Czech Republic. Later in 2017, Ryan served as an assistant coach on Perry Pearn's staff with Canada's National Women’s Team at the 2017 4 Nations Cup in Tampa, Florida, a silver medal finish. He would gain another silver as an assistant coach at the 2018 4 Nations Cup in Saskatoon, Sask.

During 2019, Ryan took on two different roles with Hockey Canada. In August 2019, Ryan was the head coach for the Canadian National Women’s Development Team, facing off against the United States during a three-game series hosted in Lake Placid, New York. Additionally, Ryan was part of the coaching staff that gained a bronze medal at the 2019 IIHF Women's World Championship in Espoo, Finland.

In May 2021, it was announced that Ryan would serve as head coach for the Canadian women's team that shall compete in Ice hockey at the 2022 Winter Olympics.

Awards and honors
 Fred Page Cup (2008)
Maritime Junior A Hockey League Coach of the Year: 2005-06, 2007-08, 2008-09 
MHL Coach of the Year (2015-16)
Hockey Nova Scotia Lifetime Achievement Award (2011)
Sport Nova Scotia Coach of the Year (2018)

References

Halifax Mooseheads players
Living people
1972 births
Canadian ice hockey coaches
Ice hockey people from Nova Scotia